Roberto Magnani (born January 13, 1977 in Parma) is an Italian former professional footballer who played as a midfielder.

He played one game in Serie A for Parma F.C. during the 1994–95 season.

He represented Italy at the 1995 UEFA European Under-19 Football Championship where they won silver medals.

External links
 

1977 births
Living people
Italian footballers
Italy youth international footballers
Serie A players
Serie B players
Parma Calcio 1913 players
A.C. Ancona players
Modena F.C. players
A.S. Gualdo Casacastalda players
A.C.R. Messina players
Treviso F.B.C. 1993 players
L.R. Vicenza players
A.C. Prato players
A.C. Reggiana 1919 players
Atletico Roma F.C. players
Association football midfielders
S.E.F. Torres 1903 players